Sirsaganj  Assembly constituency is  one of the 403 constituencies of the Uttar Pradesh Legislative Assembly,  India. It is a part of the Firozabad district and  one of the five assembly constituencies in the Firozabad Lok Sabha constituency. First election in this assembly constituency was held in  2012 after the "Delimitation of Parliamentary and Assembly  Constituencies Order, 2008" was passed and the constituency was formed  in 2008. The constituency is assigned identification number 99. The constituency has major population of Yadav and Rajput communities with significant population of other communities also.

Wards  / Areas
Extent  of Sirsaganj Assembly constituency is KCs Sirsaganj, Madanpur, Ukhrend, PCs  Bramhadabad  Lachhpur, Rudhau, Urawar Hastarf, Dohiya, Shrichandra Nagar, Late. Shri Surendra Singh Nagar, Dadiyamai New Nagla Gulal of Shikohabad KC & Sirsaganj MB of Shikohabad Tehsil.

Member of the Legislative Assembly

Election results

2022

2012
16th Vidhan Sabha: 2012 Elections

See also
Firozabad district
Firozabad Lok Sabha constituency
Sixteenth Legislative Assembly of Uttar Pradesh
Uttar Pradesh Legislative Assembly
Vidhan Bhawan

References

External links
 

Assembly constituencies of Uttar Pradesh
Firozabad district
Constituencies established in 2008